Toxodon (meaning "bow tooth" in reference to the curvature of the teeth) is an extinct genus of South American mammals from the Late Miocene to early Holocene epochs (Mayoan to Lujanian in the SALMA classification) (about 11.6 million to 11,000 years ago). It is a member of Notoungulata, one of several now extinct orders of hoofed mammals indigenous to South America distinct from living perissodactyls and artiodactyls. It was among the largest and last members of its order, and was probably the most common large hoofed mammal in South America of its time.

Taxonomy 
Toxodon was one of the last members of Notoungulata, a group of ungulates that had been part of the fauna of South America since the Paleocene. Toxodon was a member of Toxodontidae a large bodied group including similar, vaguely rhinoceros like forms.

Charles Darwin was one of the first to collect Toxodon fossils, after paying 18 pence for a T. platensis skull from a farmer in Uruguay. In The Voyage of the Beagle Darwin wrote, "November 26th – I set out on my return in a direct line for Montevideo. Having heard of some giant's bones at a neighbouring farm-house on the Sarandis, a small stream entering the Rio Negro, I rode there accompanied by my host, and purchased for the value of eighteen pence the head of the Toxodon." Since Darwin discovered that the fossils of similar mammals of South America were different from those in Europe, he invoked many debates about the evolution and natural selection of animals.

In his own words, Darwin wrote down in his journal,

Analysis of collagen sequences obtained from Toxodon as well as from Macrauchenia found that South America's native notoungulates and litopterns form a sister group to perissodactyls, making them true ungulates. This finding has been corroborated by an analysis of mitochondrial DNA extracted from a Macrauchenia fossil, which yielded a date of 66 Ma for the time of the split with perissodactyls.

Evolution 
In 2014, a study identifying a new species of toxodontid resolved the phylogenetic relations of the toxodontids, including to Toxodon. The below cladogram was found by the study:

Description 

Because of the position of its nasal openings, it is believed that Toxodon had a well-developed snout. Toxodon possessed a large, barrel shaped body. It had short stout legs with plantigrade feet with three functional relatively short toes. The hind limbs are longer and raised higher than the front limbs, giving a sloped appearance to the body. Like horses, it had a stay apparatus allowing the knees to be passively locked while standing.

The vertebrae were equipped with high apophyses, which most likely supported the massive weight and muscles as well as its powerful head. Toxodon had broad jaws which were filled with bow shaped teeth and incisors. The teeth of Toxodon have no roots and are ever-growing (euhypsodont) like those of rodents and lagomorphs, and often exhibit enamel hypoplasia.

Palaeobiology 

It was initially believed to have been amphibious, but after examining the proportions of the femur and tibia, as well as the position of its head, below the top of the spinal column, palaeontologists realized that it had features similar to terrestrial animals such as elephants or rhinoceroses. The fossils are also usually found in arid and semi-arid areas, typically an indication of a primarily terrestrial life.

Toxodon would have had a very unusual gait, due to its peculiar proportions. It may have galloped to escape predators, but like a rhino, it probably relied more on its size as protection.

Toxodon is believed to have been ecologically plastic, with its diet varying according to local conditions, with an almost totally C3 browsing diet in the Amazon rainforest, mixed feeding C3 in Bahia and the Pampas to almost completely C4 dominated grazing diet in the Chaco.

Extinction 
Toxodon became extinct at the beginning of the Holocene as part of the Quaternary extinction event, alongside almost all other large animals in South America. Previous mid-Holocene dates are now thought to be in error. Remains from the Arroyo Seco 2 site in the Pampas have been interpreted to be the result of butchery, suggesting that human hunting was a contributing factor to extinction.

Distribution 
Toxodon had a wide distribution in South America during the Late Pleistocene, extending from the Pampas into the Amazon rainforest.

Fossils of Toxodon have been found in:

Holocene
 Abismo Ponto de Flecha, Brazil
Pleistocene
 San José, Fortin Tres Pozos, Chaco and Luján Formations, Argentina
 Tarija and Ñuapua Formations, Bolivia
 Brazil
 Paraguay
 Sopas and Dolores Formations, Uruguay

Miocene-Pliocene (Montehermosan)
 Monte Hermoso Formation, Argentina

Miocene
 Ituzaingó Formation, then described as Entrerriana Formation, Argentina

References

Further reading 

 

Toxodonts
Miocene genus first appearances
Holocene extinctions
Miocene mammals of South America
Pliocene mammals of South America
Pleistocene mammals of South America
Lujanian
Ensenadan
Uquian
Chapadmalalan
Montehermosan
Huayquerian
Chasicoan
Mayoan
Neogene Argentina
Ituzaingó Formation
Pleistocene Argentina
Pleistocene Bolivia
Pleistocene Brazil
Pleistocene Paraguay
Pleistocene Uruguay
Fossils of Argentina
Fossils of Bolivia
Fossils of Brazil
Fossils of Paraguay
Fossils of Uruguay
Fossil taxa described in 1837
Taxa named by Richard Owen
Prehistoric placental genera